In algebra, a unit or invertible element of a ring is an invertible element for the multiplication of the ring. That is, an element  of a ring  is a unit if there exists  in  such that

Less commonly, the term unit is sometimes used to refer to the element  of the ring, in expressions like ring with a unit or unit ring, and also unit matrix. Because of this ambiguity,  is more commonly called the "unity" or the "identity" of the ring, and the phrases "ring with unity" or a "ring with identity" may be used to emphasize that one is considering a ring instead of a rng.

Examples
The multiplicative identity  and its additive inverse  are always units.
In a nonzero ring, the element 0 is not a unit, so  is not closed under addition.
A nonzero ring  in which every nonzero element is a unit (that is) is called a division ring (or a skew-field). A commutative division ring is called a field.

Integer ring

They constitute the multiplicative group of integers modulo .

Ring of integers of a number field

More generally, for the ring of integers  in a number field , Dirichlet's unit theorem states that  is isomorphic to the group 

This recovers the  example: The unit group of (the ring of integers of) a real quadratic field is infinite of rank 1, since .

Polynomials and power series
For a commutative ring , the units of the polynomial ring  are the polynomials

The units of the power series ring  are the power series

Matrix rings
The unit group of the ring  of  matrices over a ring  is the group  of invertible matrices. In that case,  can be given explicitly in terms of the adjugate matrix.

In general

See Hua's identity for similar results.

Group of units
A commutative ring is a local ring if  is a maximal ideal.

If  is a finite field, then  is a cyclic group of order .

Every ring homomorphism  induces a group homomorphism , since  maps units to units.  In fact, the formation of the unit group defines a functor from the category of rings to the category of groups.  This functor has a left adjoint which is the integral group ring construction.

Note that the functor  (that is) is representable in the sense:  for commutative rings  (this for instance follows from the aforementioned adjoint relation with the group ring construction).

Associatedness
Suppose that  is commutative.

The equivalence relation  can be viewed as any one of Green's semigroup relations specialized to the multiplicative semigroup of a commutative ring .

See also
 S-units
 Localization of a ring and a module

Notes

Citations

Sources 

1 (number)
Algebraic number theory
Group theory
Ring theory
Algebraic properties of elements